The Fokker Rocks are rock outcrops just south of Mount Schlossbach in the Rockefeller Mountains of Edward VII Peninsula, Antarctica. The name, applied by the Advisory Committee on Antarctic Names, recalls the fact that a Fokker airplane of the Byrd Antarctic Expedition, 1928–30, was damaged beyond repair by strong winds while it was on the ground on the south side of nearby Washington Ridge. The plane was visited by Charles Morrison of the United States Geological Survey on December 31, 1966.

References 

Rock formations of Antarctica
Landforms of the Ross Dependency
King Edward VII Land